Umak Island is an island lying in a group of small islands situated between Adak Island and Atka Island in the Andreanof Islands group of the Aleutian Islands of Alaska.

References

Andreanof Islands
Islands of Alaska
Islands of Unorganized Borough, Alaska